Calhoun County is a county in the east central part of the U.S. state of Alabama. As of the 2020 census, the population was 116,441. Its county seat is Anniston. It was named in honor of John C. Calhoun, noted politician and US Senator from South Carolina.

Calhoun County is included in the Anniston-Oxford Metropolitan Statistical Area.

History
Benton County was established on December 18, 1832, named for Thomas Hart Benton, a member of the United States Senate from Missouri. Its county seat was Jacksonville. Benton, a slave owner, was a political ally of John C. Calhoun, U.S. senator from South Carolina and also a slaveholder and planter. Through the 1820s-1840s, however, Benton's and Calhoun's political interests diverged. Calhoun was increasingly interested in using the threat of secession as a weapon to maintain and expand slavery throughout the United States. Benton, on the other hand, was slowly coming to the conclusion that slavery was wrong and that preservation of the union was paramount. On January 29, 1858, Alabama supporters of slavery, objecting to Benton's change of heart, renamed Benton County as Calhoun County.

During the Reconstruction era and widespread violence by whites to suppress black and white Republican voting in the state during the campaign for the 1870 gubernatorial election, four blacks and one white were lynched.

After years of controversy and a State Supreme Court ruling in June 1900, the county seat was moved to Anniston. 

The city was hit by an F4 tornado during the 1994 Palm Sunday tornado outbreak on March 27, 1994. Twelve minutes after the National Weather Service of Birmingham issued a tornado warning for northern Calhoun, southeastern Etowah, and southern Cherokee counties, the tornado destroyed Piedmont's Goshen United Methodist Church.

Geography

Adjacent counties
Cherokee County - northeast
Cleburne County - east
Talladega County - south
St. Clair County - west
Etowah County - northwest

National protected areas
 Mountain Longleaf National Wildlife Refuge
 Talladega National Forest (part)

Transportation

Major highways

 Interstate 20
 U.S. Highway 78
 U.S. Highway 278
 U.S. Highway 431
 State Route 9
 State Route 21
 State Route 144
 State Route 200
 State Route 202
 State Route 204
 State Route 301

Rail
Alabama and Tennessee River Railway
Norfolk Southern Railway
Amtrak

Demographics

2020 census

As of the 2020 United States census, there were 116,441 people, 44,636 households, and 28,975 families residing in the county.

2010 census
As of the census of 2010, there were 118,572 people, 47,331 households, and 31,609 families residing in the county.  The population density was 194 people per square mile (75/km2).  There were 53,289 housing units at an average density of 87 per square mile (34/km2).  The racial makeup of the county was 74.9% White, 20.6% Black or African American, 0.5% Native American, 0.7% Asian, 0.1% Pacific Islander, 1.6% from other races, and 1.7% from two or more races. 3.3% of the population were Hispanic or Latino of any race.

There were 47,331 households, out of which 26.7% had children under the age of 18 living with them, 46.8% were married couples living together, 15.2% had a female householder with no husband present, and 33.2% were non-families. 27.7% of all households were made up of individuals, and 10.2% had someone living alone who was 65 years of age or older.  The average household size was 2.44 and the average family size was 2.97.

In the county, the population was spread out, with 22.9% under the age of 18, 10.9% from 18 to 24, 24.8% from 25 to 44, 27.1% from 45 to 64, and 14.3% who were 65 years of age or older.  The median age was 38.2 years. For every 100 females there were 93.1 males.  For every 100 females age 18 and over, there were 94.8 males.

The median income for a household in the county was $38,407, and the median income for a family was $49,532. Males had a median income of $41,599 versus $29,756 for females. The per capita income for the county was $20,574.  About 15.2% of families and 19.5% of the population were below the poverty line, including 26.8% of those under age 18 and 10.9% of those age 65 or over.

Education
Calhoun County contains five public school districts. There are approximately 17,000 students in public K-12 schools in Calhoun County. Public school districts are not conterminous with the county boundary. 

The county contains two public higher education institutions. Gadsden State Community College operates a campus located in Anniston, and Jacksonville State University, founded in 1883 and with an enrollment of over 9,000 students, is located in Jacksonville.

Districts 
School districts include:

 Anniston City School District
 Calhoun County School District
 Jacksonville City School District
 Oxford City School District
 Piedmont City School District

Politics
The last Democrat to win a majority in the county was Jimmy Carter in 1976. In 2016 and 2020, Republican Donald Trump won more than two-thirds of the county's vote.

Calhoun is part of Alabama's 3rd congressional district, which is held by Republican Mike D. Rogers.

Communities

Cities

 Anniston (County Seat)
 Glencoe (partly in Etowah County)
 Jacksonville
 Oxford (partly in Talladega County and Cleburne County)
 Piedmont (partly in Cherokee County)
 Southside (partly in Etowah County)
 Weaver

Towns

 Hobson City
 Ohatchee

Census-designated places

 Alexandria
 Bynum
 Choccolocco
 Nances Creek
 Saks
 West End-Cobb Town
 White Plains

Unincorporated communities

 Chosea Springs
 DeArmanville
 Eastaboga (partly in Talladega County)
 Iron City
 Macon
 Merrellton
 Peaceburg
 Possum Trot
 Wellington

Ghost towns

 Minden
 Tooktocaugee

Places of interest
Calhoun County is home to Jacksonville State University, the Anniston Museum of Natural History, the Berman Museum of World History and the Coldwater Covered Bridge. It also contains a portion of the Talladega National Forest.

See also
National Register of Historic Places listings in Calhoun County, Alabama
Properties on the Alabama Register of Landmarks and Heritage in Calhoun County, Alabama

References

 

 
1832 establishments in Alabama
Populated places established in 1832
Counties of Appalachia